The arrondissement of Montargis is an arrondissement of France in the Loiret department in the Centre-Val de Loire region. It has 125 communes.

Composition

The communes of the arrondissement of Montargis, and their INSEE codes, are:

 Adon (45001)
 Aillant-sur-Milleron (45002)
 Amilly (45004)
 Autry-le-Châtel (45016)
 Auvilliers-en-Gâtinais (45017)
 Batilly-en-Puisaye (45023)
 Bazoches-sur-le-Betz (45026)
 Beauchamps-sur-Huillard (45027)
 Beaulieu-sur-Loire (45029)
 Bellegarde (45031)
 Le Bignon-Mirabeau (45032)
 Boismorand (45036)
 Bonny-sur-Loire (45040)
 Breteau (45052)
 Briare (45053)
 La Bussière (45060)
 Cepoy (45061)
 Cernoy-en-Berry (45064)
 Chailly-en-Gâtinais (45066)
 Châlette-sur-Loing (45068)
 Champoulet (45070)
 Chantecoq (45073)
 La Chapelle-Saint-Sépulcre (45076)
 La Chapelle-sur-Aveyron (45077)
 Chapelon (45078)
 Le Charme (45079)
 Château-Renard (45083)
 Châtenoy (45084)
 Châtillon-Coligny (45085)
 Châtillon-sur-Loire (45087)
 Chevannes (45091)
 Chevillon-sur-Huillard (45092)
 Chevry-sous-le-Bignon (45094)
 Les Choux (45096)
 Chuelles (45097)
 Conflans-sur-Loing (45102)
 Corbeilles (45103)
 Corquilleroy (45104)
 Cortrat (45105)
 Coudroy (45107)
 Coullons (45108)
 La Cour-Marigny (45112)
 Courtemaux (45113)
 Courtempierre (45114)
 Courtenay (45115)
 Dammarie-en-Puisaye (45120)
 Dammarie-sur-Loing (45121)
 Dordives (45127)
 Douchy-Montcorbon (45129)
 Ervauville (45136)
 Escrignelles (45138)
 Faverelles (45141)
 Feins-en-Gâtinais (45143)
 Ferrières-en-Gâtinais (45145)
 Fontenay-sur-Loing (45148)
 Foucherolles (45149)
 Fréville-du-Gâtinais (45150)
 Gien (45155)
 Girolles (45156)
 Gondreville (45158)
 Griselles (45161)
 Gy-les-Nonains (45165)
 Ladon (45178)
 Langesse (45180)
 Lombreuil (45185)
 Lorris (45187)
 Louzouer (45189)
 Melleroy (45199)
 Mérinville (45201)
 Mézières-en-Gâtinais (45205)
 Mignères (45206)
 Mignerette (45207)
 Montargis (45208)
 Montbouy (45210)
 Montcresson (45212)
 Montereau (45213)
 Mormant-sur-Vernisson (45216)
 Le Moulinet-sur-Solin (45218)
 Moulon (45219)
 Nargis (45222)
 Nesploy (45223)
 Nevoy (45227)
 Nogent-sur-Vernisson (45229)
 Noyers (45230)
 Ousson-sur-Loire (45238)
 Oussoy-en-Gâtinais (45239)
 Ouzouer-des-Champs (45242)
 Ouzouer-sous-Bellegarde (45243)
 Ouzouer-sur-Trézée (45245)
 Pannes (45247)
 Paucourt (45249)
 Pers-en-Gâtinais (45250)
 Pierrefitte-ès-Bois (45251)
 Poilly-lez-Gien (45254)
 Préfontaines (45255)
 Presnoy (45256)
 Pressigny-les-Pins (45257)
 Quiers-sur-Bézonde (45259)
 Rosoy-le-Vieil (45265)
 Saint-Brisson-sur-Loire (45271)
 Sainte-Geneviève-des-Bois (45278)
 Saint-Firmin-des-Bois (45275)
 Saint-Firmin-sur-Loire (45276)
 Saint-Germain-des-Prés (45279)
 Saint-Gondon (45280)
 Saint-Hilaire-les-Andrésis (45281)
 Saint-Hilaire-sur-Puiseaux (45283)
 Saint-Martin-sur-Ocre (45291)
 Saint-Maurice-sur-Aveyron (45292)
 Saint-Maurice-sur-Fessard (45293)
 Sceaux-du-Gâtinais (45303)
 La Selle-en-Hermoy (45306)
 La Selle-sur-le-Bied (45307)
 Solterre (45312)
 Thimory (45321)
 Thorailles (45322)
 Thou (45323)
 Treilles-en-Gâtinais (45328)
 Triguères (45329)
 Varennes-Changy (45332)
 Vieilles-Maisons-sur-Joudry (45334)
 Villemandeur (45338)
 Villemoutiers (45339)
 Villevoques (45343)
 Vimory (45345)

History

The arrondissement of Montargis was created in 1800.

As a result of the reorganisation of the cantons of France which came into effect in 2015, the borders of the cantons are no longer related to the borders of the arrondissements. The cantons of the arrondissement of Montargis were, as of January 2015:

 Amilly
 Bellegarde
 Briare
 Châlette-sur-Loing
 Château-Renard
 Châtillon-Coligny
 Châtillon-sur-Loire
 Courtenay
 Ferrières-en-Gâtinais
 Gien
 Lorris
 Montargis

References

Montargis